The Folkston Railfan Platform is located in Folkston, Georgia along CSX Transportation's Nahunta Subdivision, and provides a location where railfans can safely view and photograph trains. With the help of a $30,000 state grant, the city built the train-watching platform in 2001.

Since that time, the city has attracted thousands of railfans from across the nation who come to Folkston to see the dozens of CSX and the six Amtrak trains (including the daily Amtrak Auto Train) that operate between cities in Florida and cities in the south, midwest, and northeast. The platform is equipped with ceiling fans and a radio scanner that allows railfans to hear railroad-related radio traffic. Wireless internet access is available.

The double-track mainline that passes through town sees about 40 trains each day. Most CSX freight traffic into or out of Florida passes through Folkston.

External links 

Railfanning in Folkston
Folkston Funnel Railwatch
2005 Florida Times-Union article
Webarchive of the Florida Times-Union article

Buildings and structures in Charlton County, Georgia
Transportation in Charlton County, Georgia
Tourist attractions in Charlton County, Georgia
Railway buildings and structures in Georgia (U.S. state)